"6.3" is a song by French rapper Naps featuring Ninho. It was released on 2020.

Charts

Certifications

References

2020 songs
2020 singles
French-language songs